Rim: A Novel of Virtual Reality, often shortened to Rim (1994) is a novel by American writer Alexander Besher. Set in the near future where virtual reality has dominated the economy and popular culture (much like today's internet), commercial space travel is commonplace, and orbiting space hotels surpass the complexity of even the International Space Station, it follows the story of former psychic detective Frank Gobi and his son Trevor as they solve the mystery of a VR crash that leaves millions of people in a trancelike state.

The novel takes place in the year 2027. Its sequels Mir and Chi take place in 2036 and 2038, respectively.

References
Review of the novel
Page at Fiction DB

1994 novels
Fiction set in 2027
HarperCollins books
1994 debut novels